Brachylia nigeriae is a moth in the family Cossidae. It was described by George Thomas Bethune-Baker in 1915. It is found in Nigeria.

References

Natural History Museum Lepidoptera generic names catalog

Endemic fauna of Nigeria
Cossinae
Moths described in 1915
Moths of Africa